Jorge Díaz may refer to:

 Jorge Díaz Cruz (1914–1998), Associate Justice of the Puerto Rico Supreme Court
 Jorge Díaz (boxer) (fl. 1928), Chilean Olympic boxer
 Jorge Manuel Díaz (born 1966), Argentine footballer 
 Jorge Diaz (American football) (born 1973), American football offensive tackle
 Jorge Díaz (footballer, born 1977), Colombian footballer
 Jorge Diaz (actor) (born 1983), American actor
 Jorge Díaz de León (born 1984), Mexican football goalkeeper
 Jorge Díaz (sport shooter) (born 1985), Spanish sports shooter
 Jorge Díaz (footballer, born 1989), Uruguayan footballer
 Jorge Díaz (basketball) (born 1989), Puerto Rican basketball player
 Jorge Díaz (footballer, born 1998), Mexican footballer